Votoraty Futebol Clube, commonly known as Votoraty, was a Brazilian football club from Votorantim, São Paulo state. They competed in the Copa do Brasil once.

History
The club was founded on May 12, 2005 by a group of businessmen. They won the Campeonato Paulista Série A3 and the Copa Paulista de Futebol in 2009. Votoraty competed in the Copa do Brasil in 2010, when they were eliminated in the Second Stage by Grêmio.

Achievements
Copa Paulista de Futebol: 1
2009

Campeonato Paulista Série A3: 1
2009

Stadium
Votoraty Futebol Clube play their home games at Estádio Domênico Paolo Mettidieri. The stadium has a maximum capacity of 10,034 people.

References

Association football clubs established in 2005
Football clubs in São Paulo (state)
2005 establishments in Brazil